The "Tribe Fight Song" is the official fight song of The College of William & Mary, located in Williamsburg, Virginia. Throughout the College's history there have been three official fight songs. The original fight song, titled "Victory", was written in 1929 by Oscar E. Wilkinson. Two years later, a new fight song titled "Fight, Fight, Fight for the Indians" was published in the William & Mary student handbook. Many years later, a third edition was written which is still used today. Simply "Tribe Fight Song", it is supposed to be sung after every touchdown the Tribe football team scores at home games.

A second, lesser known song was composed by Rolfe Kennard in the 1930s. The "William & Mary Victory March" is occasionally played before games, most often at Homecoming.

Notes
 William & Mary used to be known as the Indians prior to their moniker change to the Tribe.

References

External links
The College of William & Mary official website
Tribe Athletics
All three fight songs' official lyrics

William & Mary Tribe
American college songs
College fight songs in the United States
Colonial Athletic Association fight songs
Year of song missing